The Maranhão gubernatorial election was held on October 3, 2010, to elect the next governor of Maranhão. Incumbent Governor Roseana Sarney was reelected for a second term.

Candidates

Election results

References 

2010 Brazilian gubernatorial elections
October 2010 events in South America
2010